Wolayita or Wolaita is an administrative zone in Ethiopia. It is named for the Welayta people, whose homeland is in the zone. Wolayita is bordered on the south by Gamo Gofa, on the west by the Omo River which separates it from Dawro, on the northwest by Kembata Tembaro, on the north by Hadiya, on the northeast by the Oromia Region, on the east by the Bilate River which separates it from Sidama Region, and on the south east by the Lake Abaya which separates it from Oromia Region. The administrative centre of Wolayita is Sodo. Other major towns are  Areka, Boditi, Tebela, Bele, Gesuba, Gununo, Bedessa and Dimtu.

Its highest point is Mount Damota (2738 meters).

History

Before 1894
The people of Wolayta are known for their more than fifty kings within three dynasties. The kings of Wolaita got the title Kawo. The Wolaytta nationality are a proud people who had a distinct, continuous, strong and independent kingdoms going back to the 13th Century and beyond to the first Millennium until 1894. The war of resistance led by the last Kawo (King) of Wolaita, Tona Gaga, was one of the bloodiest campaigns in Menelik's whole period of expansion, which resulted in the incorporation of the Wolaita Kingdom, along with other nationalities and peoples in the South, into the Ethiopian Empire. The Wolaita's military resistance, and repulsion of Menelik’s generals (which were armed with modern firearms), showed the strength of Wolaita's military organization and people. The Wolaita’s resistance was finally crushed, with it conquered by Ethiopia, in 1894 after the bloodiest battle led by Emperor Menelik II himself.

From 1894
Despite the centuries-old oppression, the Welaita people have a distinct national identity, that is, the people have a language, culture, traditions, history, a psychological make-up, and a contiguous geography that define them and make them distinct from other nationalities and people in Ethiopia. The Wolayta people’s resistance and struggle against the Monarchical regime for economic and political emancipation, and the anti-democratic denial of the Wolaita peoples self-governance afterwards epitomizes their enduring and uninterrupted struggle for self-determination.

Quest for statehood
During the 1991-94 Transitional Government period, the Wolaita had its own Region which was Kilil 9 but it was merged into the Southern Nations, Nationalities, and Peoples' Region (SNNPR) when the federation was constituted in 1995. Since, there has been public discontent and opposition members requesting autonomy were beaten, tortured, and a significant number of youths exiled.

In 1997, SEPDM tried to create WOGAGODA, merging the neighboring ethnicities with Wolayta, which ultimately would have diluted the century-old culture and emblem of the Wolaita people. That attempt saw a fierce struggle from the people and the government’s homogenizing move was finally abandoned. However, thousands were detained and hundreds were killed, and hundreds of thousands of ethnic Wolaita were forcefully displaced from Arba Minch, the then capital of North Omo Zone, which dissolved after Wolaita, Gamo Goffa and Dawro split and formed their own zonal administration between 1998 and 2000. In popular mob security forces killed at least five when the Wolaita successfully campaigned for their own zone and rejected the attempted imposition of the new composite language and identity.

Until 2000 Wolayita was part of the North Omo Zone, and the 1994 national census counted its inhabitants as part of that zone. However friction between the various ethnic groups in Semien Omo, which was often blamed on the Welayta for "ethnic chauvinism" and despite the efforts of the ruling party to emphasize the need to co-ordinate, consolidate, and unify the smaller ethnic units to achieve the "efficient use of scarce government resources", eventually led to the division of the zone in 2000, resulting in the creation of not only the Wolaita, but also the Gamo Gofa and Dawro Zones, and two special woredas.

The constitutional rights of the Wolaita people for statehood has gathered momentum in the recent years, where following widespread consultation held at all levels the proposal to establish a Wolaita Regional State was approved. The Zonal Council unanimously voted to demand statehood, and consistent with the letter and spirit of the Constitution sent a formal letter on 19 December 2018 to the SNNPR Government requesting a referendum.

38 members of SNNPR Council who represent the Wolaita zone withdrew themselves from the region's council in protests against move to reorganize the region into 4 states. Wolaita zone representatives say the move didn't consider their request for separate statehood.

In May and December 2019 rallies were held in Wolaita supporting the separation of the zone from the SNNPR to become a region in its own right. A rally on 20 December 2019, oppose the failure of the regional council to send a request of the zone to become a regional state to the National Board of Election to arrange a referendum.

Geography

Wolayta is limited north west by Tambaro, eastward by Bilate river which divides it from Arsi-Oromo, Southward by Lake Abaya and Kucha, westward by Omo River. Gilgel Gibe III Dam is a hydroelectric power plant built on Omo river; and with the capacity of 1870 Megawatt, it is the third largest hydroelectric plant in Africa.

Through undulating hills there are no large forests except in the Soddo Zuriya, and Omo river basin, which is below  and a malaria zone.

In the local view, there are only two regions: the highlands (Geziyaa) and the lowlands (Garaa). In the highlands, there are streams and small rivers. Several thermal hot springs are situated around Lake Abaya, with boiling and steaming water.

The soil of the Wolayta is of heavy red color which becomes brown and black during the rains and has the fragility and the softness of sand. The dry period makes the soil hard as brick, making ploughing and digging possible after the rains.  The layer of soil is very deep—an average of 30 meters—in both the plains and the hills, as verified during the drilling of wells. The soil is fertile and produce two crops per year when the rains are regular.

Climate
Wolaita's climate has a bimodal rainfall pattern that lasts from March to October. The first rainy season lasts from March to May. The season lasts from July to October, with a peak in July and August. Over the last 43 years, the average annual rainfall has been . The average yearly temperature is 19.9 °C, with monthly temperatures ranging from 17.7 °C in July to 22.1 °C in February and March.

The climate is stable, with temperature variation between 24 and 30 °C during the day and 16 to 20 °C at night, all year round. The year is divided into two seasons: the wet season (balguwa) from June to October, and the dry season (boniya) from October to June, broken in February by a short period of so-called "little rains" (baddessa).

The dry season is characterized by a strong wind which blows from the east. During the wet seasons, heavy precipitation and violent storms which, at the end of the season can last a full evening or night are common events. Fog can be seen in the valleys almost every morning of the rainy season; it then evaporates in the first hours of the sun. In both dry and wet seasons either hail which destroys crops or tornadoes, which knock down trees, are possible events.

Demographics 

From total population of the zone females count 2,698,261 and males count 2,687,021. Wolayita has a population density of 356.67. While 366,567 or 11.49% are urban inhabitants, a further 1,196 or 0.08% are pluralists. A total of 310,454 households were counted in the zone, which results in an average of 4.84 persons to a household, and 297,981 housing units. The largest ethnic group reported in the zone is the Wolayta (96.31%); all other ethnic groups made up 3.69% of the population. Welayta is spoken as a first language by 96.82% of the inhabitants; the remaining 3.18% spoke all other primary languages reported. 71.34% were Protestants, 21% of the population said they practiced Ethiopian Orthodox Christianity, and 5.35% embraced Catholicism.

Urbanization
Wolaita Zone is composed of sixteen woredas and six city administrations. There are also different towns and cities in the Wolaita zone.  Sodo town is administrative and trading center it is located at the center of roads to and seven entering gates. The followings are urban centres in the Wolaita Zone.
 
 Areka
 Bada
 Bedessa
 Beklo Segno 
 Bele  
 Bitena 
 Boditi 
 Bombe 
 Dalbo
 Dimtu 
 Edo
 Faracho
 Gacheno
 Gara Godo
 Gesuba
 Gununo
 Halale
 Kercheche
 Lasho
 Sake
 Shanto 
 Sodo    
 Tebela

Culture
Gifaata is the most well-known festival among those rituals in Wolaita that has been celebrated annually in the month of September. The festival of New Year in Wolaita called Gifaata, is celebrated eating the special foods Baccira and Muchuwa on the eve and throughout the celebration weeks. Gifaata is Wolaita's New year festival-which Wolaitas had beencelebrating many hundred years ago. Gifaata celebrated in always Sunday in each Year, which falls between Meskerem (September) 14 and 20. Gifaata is a bridge that brings together all from near and far.

Tourism
Alternatively, tourists may take the local bus transportation from Addis Ababa to Wolaita or travel by air, flying into Arba Minch and taking land transportation from Arba Minch to Wolaita Sodo. The city has a bus terminal and an airport. However, the latter is not fully functional and does not accept commercial flights.

There are different potential tourist sites, that were selected in the Wolaita Zone to assess the region's ability to capture the natural heritage and cultural heritage tourist markets.

Ajora Falls
As with many tourist sites throughout Ethiopia, tourism at Ajora Falls is dominated by domestic tourists, sometimes exceeding foreign tourists by 23 times. Annually the site averages 14 international and 195 domestic tourists.

Mochena Borago
The Mochena Borago Rockshelter is located northwest of the city of Wolaita Sodo, on the southwestern slope of Mt. Damota. In order to access the Mochena Borago Rockshelter, tourists drive approximately,  from Wolaita Sodo along the Hosanna road. A sign marks the turnoff for the unpaved road leading to the rockshelter. Over the years, access to the site has become easier. A small trickling waterfall runs off the top of the rockshelter into a stream that runs to the base of the mountain. From 2006 to 2008 the University of Florida’s Southwest Ethiopia Archaeological Project (SWEAP) concentrated upon excavating the shelter’s late Pleistocene deposits.

Natural Bridge
This bridge is found in Wolaita Zone offa woreda at a distance of 5 k.m from wereda town Gesuba and 29 k.m from zonal administrative town, Sodo. The bridge which was made naturally from one  big stone lying over the flowing river Manisa. The name of this bridge called (ye egzier dildiy) in Amharic

Abala Chokare (Bilbo Hotspring)
The hot spring is situated in Humbo Woreda Abela mareka kebele. The circle shaped hot spring covers wide areas and has rising smoke and boiled bubbles coming from within the ground and the water vapor can be seen from a distance.

Mount Damota
Damota mountain is found in wolaita zone Sodo Zuria woreda about 12 k.m away from the town of Sodo to the North, and is nearly 3000 meter above sea level.

Sports 
There are different clubs in Wolaita that compete in various sporting activities at a national and continental level.
Wolaitta Dicha S.C. is an Ethiopian football club based in Sodo. The club was established in 2009 by the Welayta Development Association. Wolaitta Dicha is a name that now common with East African nationals and even the entire Africa. The club from Southern Ethiopia eliminated Egyptian giants and five times winners of the CAF Champions league Zamalek in a dramatic penalty shootout in Cairo. The club replaced the Wolaita Tussa S.C. before the so-called tussa restructured and came into picture newly. The club got its nickname "Bees of Tona" from the Wolaita Kingdom leader "King Tona" in the 19th century.
Wolaitta Dicha S.C. club won its first domestic cup in 2017, and qualified for the 2018 CAF Confederation Cup, in which the club beat Zamalek SC and passed to the quarter-final.

Wolaita Sodo City sport Club is also another which is based in the city of Wolaita Sodo. It was officially established in 2011. The club is participating in Ethiopian First League.

Boditi City F.C. is Ethiopian football club based on the city of Boditi. The Club represented Wolayita Zone in the Southern Nations, Nationalities, and Peoples' Region (SNNPR) Championship in Jinka, ended its season with a victory.

Wolaita Dicha Men's volleyball team was established in January 2005 E.C. Wolaita Dicha Volleyball Team is sport team based in Wolaita Sodo. The team won Ethiopia volleyball premier league several times. And as well as represented Ethiopia in the African volleyball club championship of 2019 and 2021.

Areka City F.C. is a club that is based at Areka in Wolaita. It was officially established in 2000. They are a member of the Ethiopian Football Federation and play in the Ethiopian First League.

Mass media

The Wolayita Zone Administration has made great strides in the social, economic and political spheres over the years in its efforts to achieve rapid and sustainable economic growth by developing a long-term and medium-term plan to alleviate poverty and backwardness and improve the public's access to various media resources. The mass media in wolaita consist of radio, television and the Internet, which remain under the control of the Ethiopian government, as well as private newspapers and magazines. The radio broadcasting stations in Sodo include Radio wogeta 96.6 and Radio fana 99.9.
Satellite television has been very popular in Ethiopia for many years. In addition to this, Wolaita Tv which made Wolayita Zone accessible to the cultural and historical information of the people of the zone by investing heavily in various media outlets due to the lack of television media in the area.

Education

Education is a key to ensuring the sustainable socio-economic and political development of a country. Wolaita Zone, in Ethiopia's Southern Nations, Nationalities, and Peoples' Region (SNNPR), is a rural and thickly inhabited area. The educational system is struggling to provide excellent instruction and assistance, and secondary schools are in limited supply. To this end to improve education system in the Zone, Zonal education department working with Scotland’s leading international education charity. This organization working to improve education across sub-Saharan Africa and beyond.
In Wolaita, there are schools that are among the oldest in Ethiopia; for instance, the Dubbo Our Lady’s Catholic School and Ligaba Aba-Sebsib school, which were established in 1933 and 1945, respectively.
Wolaita Sodo University (WSU, established in 2007, is a public higher education institution located in Sodo. The university has been engaged in teaching/learning, research and community services. The university has campuses in different areas, such as in Gandaba, Otona and Dawuro Tarcha Campuses.

Wolayta sodo Agricultural College This college was established in 2001. It is technical and vocational training centre established in Wolaita Sodo city. In addition to these, Sodo city schools include Wolaita Sodo Secondary & preparatory school, Wolaita Liqa School and also Bogale Walelu Secondary and Preparatory School.

List of head administrators of Wolaita Zone
Wolaita Zone chief administrators since 2000.
 2000 to 2001, Mamo Godebo, SEPDM
 2001 to 2004, Firew Altaye, SEPDM
 2004 to 2008, Amanuel Otoro, SEPDM
 2008 to 2010, Haileberhan Zena, SEPDM
 2011 to 2013, Tesfaye Yigezu, SEPDM
 2013 to 2016, Eyob Wate, SEPDM
 2016 to 2018, Asrat Tera, PhD, SEPDM
 July 2018 to November 2018, Getahun Garedew, PhD, SEPDM
 2018 to 28 August 2020, Dagato Kumbe, Prosperity Party
 28 August 2020 to 19 October 2021, Endrias Geta, PhD, Prosperity Party
 19 October 2021 to present, Akililu Lemma, Prosperity Party

Administrative divisions

* City administrations, which are considered as Woreda for all administrative purposes.

Economy
Agriculture is the livelihood for more than 90% of the population in the rural areas. Animal husbandry is complementary to crop production, and the livestock population of Wolayita with estimated standing populations of 685,886 cattle, 87,525 sheep, 90,215 goats, 1951 horses, 669,822 poultry and 38,564 bee hives. 
Farmers are well known for the production of livestock, predominantly cattle for their organic beef and butter (Million, 2003). They have long tradition of fattening oxen distinctively practiced using local/home based feed supplement/concentrate (cereal grains, root and tuber crops), household leftovers, grass)(Takele and Habtamu, 2009). The Sodo milkshed is also one of the areas with a strong potential to achieve growth in milk production.    
Maize, haricot bean, taro, sweet potato, enset, banana, avocado, mango and coffee are the major crops with tremendous benefits to smallholder farmers’ in Wolaita and surrounding areas (CSA, 2020). Cassava is also flourishing nowadays. 
Mixed farming involving the production of cereals, root crops, Enset, and coffee are practiced. Enset is an essential element in Wolayita food economy and acts as a staple, or co-staple, food. Where land is very scarce and consequently where cereal harvests are low, high yielding Enset offers some opportunity for food security. Enset is also popular because of its drought resistant properties.

Fauna and Flora 

In the Wolaita, the spread of animal species is also diverse. Middle-order mammals predominate, with a small population of herbivores and a small number of peripheral species.
Throughout the year, eucalyptus, pines, acacia, magnolias, fire trees, and giant sycamores coexist alongside fake banana trees (Utta). Grass may reach three meters in height towards the conclusion of the wet season.
The communities are surrounded by enormous fields of grain and, above all, large cotton plantations, which serve as indicators of their wealth. Here is the cotton land, where Ethiopian mantles are manufactured, where this plant thrives, which, together with coffee, is the source of Ethiopia's current wealth and will become the country's major export commodity in the near future.
Maize, wheat, durra, barley, and teff are all grown in the area. Many of them may be harvested twice a year.
All Mediterranean trees produce fruit throughout the year: grapes, apples, pears, peaches, apricots, oranges, tangerines, bananas, papayas, avocados, and so on.

Notable persons 
 Legese Mota Barata governor of Ethiopia National Bank During Derg regime
 Simeon Galore, was chief administrator of Illubabor and North Omo Region
 Kawo Motolomi Sato, Founder and one of the most famous king of Kingdom of Wolaita. He ruled most part of the present day Ethiopia in the 12thc under the Damot Kingdom. 
 Kawo Ogato Sana, was the one of the most renowned king of the Kingdom of Wolaita along with Tigre dynasty.
 Kawo Sana Tube, was 9th king from Wolaita Tigre dynasty during Kingdom of Wolaita
 Kawo Tona Gaga, the last king of Kingdom of Wolaita. Believed to be one of the greatest warrior and the most powerful king of Wolayta. His army defeated King Menelik's forces six times before losing to combined forces of Menelik and Abba Jifar in 1896.
 Firew Altaye, Ethiopian politician and second chief administrator of Wolayita Zone
 Hailemariam Desalegn  (Engr), Former Prime Minister of Ethiopia
 Samuel Urkato (PhD), commissioner of Federal Anti-corruption Commission and he also served as Minister of Ministry of Science and Higher Education
 Teshome Toga,   Ambassador to China
 Roman Tesfaye – First Lady of Ethiopia (2012–2018). In the past, she held senior management positions in the United Nations Development Program and other offices
 Sancho Gebre Ethiopian singer, choreographer and dancer.
 Gildo Kassa Ethiopian record producer, songwriter and singer.
 Kamuzu Kassa Ethiopian music composer and songwriter.
 Teklewold Atnafu Ethiopian politician who governed National Bank of Ethiopia for nearly two decades.
 Mengistu Haile Mariam an Ethiopian soldier and politician who was the head of state of Ethiopia from 1977 to 1991 and General Secretary of the Workers' Party of Ethiopia from 1984 to 1991.
 Getahun Garedew (PhD); Director General of FDRE Environment Protection Authority, Former State minister at Ministry of Education
 Yeshurun Alemayehu ADDE, formerly called Kibret, (PhD); is Deputy Director General of Ethiopian Space Science & Technology Institute, Team Leader of the First Ethiopian Satellite Development Team
 Chernet Gugesa, is an Ethiopian professional who plays for Ethiopian Premier League club Saint George and the Ethiopia national team.

References 

Southern Nations, Nationalities, and Peoples' Region
Zones of Ethiopia
Wolayita Zone
Zones in Southern Nations, Nationalities, and Peoples' Region
Wolayita